Rashid Stadium is a multi-purpose stadium in Dubai, United Arab Emirates. It is currently used mostly for football and rugby matches. The stadium holds 12,000 people. It was built in 1948.

The stadium hosted several matches of the 2003 FIFA World Youth Championship, 2013 FIFA U-17 World Cup, and 2019 AFC Asian Cup.

2019 AFC Asian Cup 
Rashid Stadium hosted five games of the 2019 Asian Cup, including a Round of 16 match.

References

External links 
Soccerway.com

Rashid
Rashid
Sports venues completed in 1948
Rashid
Multi-purpose stadiums in the United Arab Emirates
Rugby union in Dubai
Shabab Al-Ahli Dubai FC